Algibacter onchidii is a Gram-negative, rod-shaped, aerobic and non-motile bacterium from the genus of Algibacter which has been isolated from a Onchidium species from the South China Sea.

References

Flavobacteria
Bacteria described in 2021